The controversy surrounding the political status of Taiwan or the Taiwan issue is a result of World War II, the second phase of the Chinese Civil War (1945–1949), and the Cold War.

The basic issue hinges on who the islands of Taiwan, Penghu, Kinmen, and Matsu should be administered by. The main options includes:  
Maintain the current ROC/PRC (Taiwan/Mainland) status quo.
Taiwan as a de facto separate self-governing entity. 
Become part of China as a province or special administrative region of the PRC under the one country, two systems framework (like Hong Kong and Macau). 
Formally abolish the ROC and establish a de jure independent Taiwanese state. 
Unify with mainland China under the Government of the ROC (zh). 
Annexed under the Government of the PRC.

This controversy also concerns whether the current status quo of existence and legal status as a sovereign state of both the ROC and the PRC is legitimate as a matter of international law.

The status quo is accepted in large part because it does not define the legal or future status of Taiwan, leaving each group to interpret the situation in a way that is politically acceptable to its members. At the same time, a policy of status quo has been criticized as being dangerous precisely because different sides have different interpretations of what the status quo is, leading to the possibility of war through brinkmanship or miscalculation. The PRC seeks the end of Taiwan's de facto independence through the process of unification, and has not ruled out the use of force in pursuit of this goal. Internationally, the United Nations and countries that have diplomatic relations with the PRC handle relations with Taiwan according to the "One China" policy.

Background 

Taiwan (excluding Penghu) was first populated by Austronesian people and was partially colonized by the Dutch, who had arrived in 1623. The Kingdom of Tungning, lasting from 1661 to 1683, was the first Han Chinese government to rule part of the island of Taiwan. From 1683, the Qing Dynasty ruled much of the western plains of the island as a prefecture and in 1875 divided the island into two prefectures, Taiwan and Taipeh. In 1885 the island was made into a separate province to speed up development in this region. In the aftermath of the First Sino-Japanese War, Taiwan and Penghu were ceded by the Qing Dynasty to Japan in 1895 under the Treaty of Shimonoseki. The Republic of China overthrew the Qing dynasty in 1912. At the end of World War II, the Republic of China, on behalf of the Allied Powers, accepted the surrender of Japanese troops in Taiwan, putting Taiwan under the control of a Chinese government again after 50 years of Japanese rule. The ROC would then claim sovereignty on the basis of the Qing dynasty's administration, Cairo Declaration, Potsdam Declaration, and Japanese Instrument of Surrender, but this became contested by pro-independence groups in subsequent years due to different perceptions of the said documents' legality. Upon losing the Chinese civil war in 1949, the ROC government retreated to Taipei and kept control over a few islands along the coast of mainland China and in the South China Sea. The People's Republic of China (PRC) was established in mainland China on 1 October 1949, claiming to be the successor to the ROC.

Quemoy, Matsu and Wuchiu on the coast of Fukien, Taiping and Pratas in the South China Sea, are part of the ROC's present territory, but were not ceded to Japan. Some arguments supporting the independence of Taiwan do not apply to these islands.

Development of the controversy

Taiwan, Penghu, Kinmen, Matsu, and some other minor islands effectively make up the jurisdiction of the state with the official name of the Republic of China (ROC), commonly known as "Taiwan". The ROC, which asserted control of Taiwan (as well as Penghu and other nearby islands) in 1945, had ruled mainland China and claimed sovereignty over Tibet (now controlled by the PRC as the Tibet Autonomous Region), Outer Mongolia (now Mongolia) and Tannu Uriankhai (now a part of Tuva, Russia) before losing the Chinese Civil War to the Chinese Communist Party and relocating its government and capital city from Nanjing to Guangzhou, Chongqing and Chengdu before arriving at Taipei as the temporary capital in December 1949. The Communists established a new government on the mainland as People's Republic of China (PRC) in October 1949.

Since the ROC lost its United Nations seat as "China" in 1971 (replaced by the PRC), most sovereign states have switched their diplomatic recognition to the PRC, recognizing the PRC as the representative of all China, though all countries that have established formal diplomatic ties with the PRC use terms such as "respects", "acknowledge", "understand", "take note of" in regards to the PRC's claim over Taiwan which avoids clarifying what territories are meant by "China" in order to associate with both the PRC and ROC. , just 15 countries maintain diplomatic relations with the ROC, although informal relations are maintained with nearly all others. Agencies of foreign governments such as the American Institute in Taiwan operate as de facto embassies of their home countries in Taiwan, and Taiwan operates similar de facto embassies and consulates in most countries under such names as "Taipei Representative Office" (TRO) or "Taipei Economic and Cultural (Representative) Office" (TECO). In certain contexts, Taiwan is also referred to as Chinese Taipei.

The ROC government has in the past actively pursued the claim as the sole legitimate government over mainland China and Taiwan. This position began to change in the early 1990s as democracy was introduced and new Taiwanese leaders were elected, changing to one that does not actively challenge the legitimacy of PRC rule over mainland China.  Both the PRC and the ROC carry out Cross-Strait relations through specialized agencies (such as the Mainland Affairs Council of the ROC and the Taiwan Affairs Office of the PRC) rather than through foreign ministries. Different groups have different concepts of the current formal political situation in Taiwan. 

In addition, the situation can be confusing because of the different parties and the effort by many groups to deal with the controversy through a policy of deliberate ambiguity.  The political solution that is accepted by many of the current groups is the perspective of the status quo: to unofficially treat Taiwan as a state and, at a minimum, to officially declare no support for the government of this state making a formal declaration of independence. What a formal declaration of independence would consist of is not clear and can be confusing given the fact that the People's Republic of China has never controlled Taiwan, and the Republic of China still exists, albeit on a decreased scale.

Argument for Taiwan being legally part of China 
In the Cairo Conference of 1943, the allied powers agreed to have Japan restore "all the territories Japan has stolen from the Chinese", specifically listing "Formosa" and Penghu, to the Republic of China after the defeat of Japan. According to both the People's Republic of China and the Republic of China, this agreement was given legal force by the Instrument of Surrender of Japan in 1945. The PRC's UN Ambassador, Wang Yingfan, has stated multiple times in the UN general committee: "Taiwan is an inseparable part of China's territory since antiquity" and "both the 1943 Cairo Declaration and the 1945 Potsdam Declaration have reaffirmed in unequivocal terms China's sovereignty over Taiwan as a matter of international law." The PRC rejects arguments involving the lack of a specific treaty (San Francisco Peace Treaty) transferring Taiwan's sovereignty to China by noting that neither PRC nor ROC was a signatory to any such treaty, making the treaties irrelevant with regard to Chinese claims. Also, according to the Treaty of Shimonoseki, China legally surrendered its sovereignty and jurisdiction over Taiwan (Formosa) forever. So this treaty, therefore, renders Japan's declaration of the returning of sovereignty over Taiwan to China as well as the PRC's UN Ambassador, Wang Yingfan's claims regarding China's right to sovereignty over Taiwan, as legally extraneous and unsubstantiated. The US and UK governments also hold that the Cairo Declaration made in 1943 is just a wartime statement of intention and cannot transfer the sovereignty of Taiwan from Japan to China.

The ROC argues that the Treaty of Taipei implicitly transferred the sovereignty of Taiwan to it. However, the US State Dept. disagreed with such an interpretation in its 1971 Starr Memorandum.

Arguments against Taiwan being legally part of China 
A number of supporters of Taiwan independence argue that Taiwan was only formally incorporated as a Chinese territory under the Qing Dynasty in 1683, and as a province in 1885. Subsequently, because of the Shimonoseki Treaty of 1895, Taiwan had been de jure part of Japan when the ROC was established in 1912 and thus was not part of the Chinese republic. Also, because the Cairo Declaration was an unsigned press communiqué, the independence advocates argue that the legal effectiveness of the Declaration is highly questionable. Furthermore, they point out that the Instrument of Surrender of Japan was no more than an armistice, a "modus vivendi" in nature, which served as a temporary or provisional agreement that would be replaced with a peace treaty.  Therefore, only a military occupation of Taiwan began on 25 October 1945, and both the Treaty of San Francisco and Treaty of Taipei hold legal supremacy over the surrender instrument. These treaties did not transfer the title of Taiwan from Japan to China. Some argue that Taiwan was returned to the people of Taiwan when Japan renounced sovereignty of Taiwan based on the policy of self-determination which has been applied to "territories which detached from enemy states as a result of the Second World War" as defined by article 76b and 77b of the United Nations Charter and also by the protocol of the Yalta Conference. The United Nations General Assembly has not been particularly receptive to this argument, and the ROC's applications for admission to the United Nations have been rejected 15 times. 

Although the interpretation of the peace treaties was used to challenge the legitimacy of the ROC in Taiwan before the 1990s, the introduction of popular elections in Taiwan has compromised this position. Except for the most extreme Taiwan independence supporters, most Taiwanese support the popular sovereignty theory and no longer see much conflict between this theory of sovereignty and the ROC position. In this sense, the ROC government currently administering Taiwan is not the same ROC that accepted the Japanese surrender because the ruling authorities were given popular mandate by different pools of constituencies: one is the mainland Chinese electorate, the other is the Taiwanese constituencies. In fact, former president Chen Shui-bian has been frequently emphasizing the popular sovereignty theory in his speeches.

However, the conflict between these two theories still plays a role in internal Taiwanese politics. The popular sovereignty theory, which the pan-green coalition emphasizes, suggests that Taiwan could make fundamental constitutional changes by means of a popular referendum. The ROC legal theory, which is supported by the pan-blue coalition, suggests that any fundamental constitutional changes would require that the amendment procedure of the ROC constitution be followed.

Historical overview

1895–1945 – Japanese rule

Treaty of Shimonoseki 

Taiwan (Formosa) including the Pescadores was permanently ceded by Qing Dynasty China to Imperial Japan via Articles 2b and 2c of the Treaty of Shimonoseki on 8 May 1895 in one of what the Chinese term an unequal treaty. Kinmen and Matsu Islands on the coast of Fukien, and the islands in the South China Sea currently administered by the Republic of China on Taiwan were not part of the cession.

In 1895, subsequent to the Treaty of Shimonoseki, officials in Taiwan declared independence. The Republic of Taiwan (1895) collapsed after 12 days due to political infighting, but local leaders continued resistance in the hope of achieving self-rule. The incoming Japanese crushed the island's independence bid in a five-month campaign.

The Chinese Qing Dynasty was subsequently overthrown and replaced by the Republic of China (ROC). Upon the outbreak of the Second Sino-Japanese War, the ROC declared the Treaty of Shimonoseki void in its declaration of war on Japan. The war soon merged with World War II, and Japan was subsequently defeated in 1945 by the Allied Powers, of which the ROC was a part.

Potsdam Declaration and surrender of Japan 
The United States entered the War in December 1941. The United States military forces conducted most military attacks against Japanese installations and Japanese troops in Taiwan. At the Cairo Conference, the U.S., the United Kingdom, and the ROC agreed that Taiwan was to be restored to the ROC after the war. This agreement was enunciated in the Cairo Declaration, and the Potsdam Declaration, which outlined the terms of the Japanese surrender, specified that the terms of the Cairo Declaration shall be carried out.

When Japan unconditionally surrendered, it accepted in its Instrument of Surrender the terms of the Potsdam Declaration.  Japanese troops in Taiwan were directed to surrender to the representatives of the Supreme Allied Commander in the China Theater, Chiang Kai-shek (i.e. the Republic of China military forces) on behalf of the Allies, according to the directions of General Douglas MacArthur, head of the United States Military Government, in General Order No. 1, which was issued 2 September 1945. Chief Executive Chen Yi of Republic of China soon proclaimed "Taiwan Retrocession Day" on 25 October 1945.

1945–present – post-World War II status

1947 – 228 Incident 

When the 228 Incident erupted on 28 February 1947, the U.S. Consulate-General in Taipei prepared a report in early March, calling for an immediate intervention in the name of the U.S. or the United Nations. Based on the argument that the Japanese surrender did not formally transfer sovereignty, Taiwan was still legally part of Japan and occupied by the United States (with administrative authority for the occupation delegated to the Chinese Nationalists), and a direct intervention was appropriate for a territory with such status. This proposed intervention, however, was rejected by the U.S. State Department. In a news report on the aftermath of the 228 Incident, some Taiwanese residents were reported to be talking of appealing to the United Nations to put the island under an international mandate since  China's possession of Taiwan had not been formalized by any international treaties by that time, and the island was therefore still under belligerent occupation.
They later made a demand for a treaty role to be represented at the forthcoming peace conference in Japan, in the hope of requesting a plebiscite to determine the island's political future.

1950–1953 – Korean War and U.S. intervention 
At the start of 1950, U.S. President Harry S. Truman appeared to accept the idea that sovereignty over Taiwan was already settled when the United States Department of State stated that "In keeping with these [Cairo and Potsdam] declarations, Formosa was surrendered to Generalissimo Chiang-Kai Shek, and for the past four years, the United States and Other Allied Powers have accepted the exercise of Chinese authority over the Island."
However, after the outbreak of the Korean War, Truman decided to "neutralize" Taiwan, claiming that it could otherwise trigger another world war. In June 1950, President Truman, who had previously given only passive support to Chiang Kai-shek and was prepared to see Taiwan fall into the hands of the Chinese Communists, vowed to stop the spread of communism and sent the U.S. Seventh Fleet into the Taiwan Strait to prevent the PRC from attacking Taiwan, but also to prevent the ROC from attacking mainland China. He then declared that "the determination of the future status of Formosa must await the restoration of security in the Pacific, a peace settlement with Japan, or consideration by the United Nations." President Truman later reaffirmed the position "that all questions affecting Formosa be settled by peaceful means as envisaged in the Charter of the United Nations" in his special message to Congress in July 1950. The PRC denounced his moves as flagrant interference in the internal affairs of China.

On 8 September 1950, President Truman ordered John Foster Dulles, then Foreign Policy Advisor to the U.S. Secretary of State, to carry out his decision on "neutralizing" Taiwan in drafting the Treaty of Peace with Japan (San Francisco Peace Treaty) of 1951. According to George H. Kerr's memoir Formosa Betrayed, Dulles devised a plan whereby Japan would first merely renounce its sovereignty over Taiwan without a recipient country to allow the sovereignty over Taiwan to be determined together by the United States, the United Kingdom, Soviet Union, and the Republic of China on behalf of other nations on the peace treaty. The question of Taiwan would be taken into the United Nations (of which the ROC was still part) if these four parties could not reach an agreement within one year.

1952 – Treaty of Peace with Japan (San Francisco) 

When Japan regained sovereignty over itself in 1952 with the conclusion of the Treaty of Peace with Japan (San Francisco Peace Treaty) with 48 nations, Japan renounced all claims and titles over Taiwan and the Pescadores. Many claims that Japanese sovereignty only terminated at that point. Notably absent at the peace conference was the ROC which was expelled from mainland China in December 1949 as a result of the Chinese Civil War and had retreated to Taiwan. The PRC, which was proclaimed on 1 October 1949, was also not invited. The lack of invitation was probably due to the dispute over which government was the legitimate government of China (which both governments claimed to be); however, Cold War considerations might have played a part as well. Some major governments represented in the San Francisco Conference, such as the UK and Soviet Union, had already established relations with the PRC, while others, such as the U.S. and Japan, still held relations with the ROC.

The UK at that time stated for the record that the San Francisco Peace Treaty "itself does not determine the future of these islands," and therefore, the UK, along with Australia and New Zealand, was happy to sign the peace treaty. One of the major reasons that the delegate from the Soviet Union gave for not signing the treaty was that: "The draft contains only a reference to the renunciation by Japan of its rights to these territories [Taiwan] but intentionally omits any mention of the further fate of these territories."

Article 25 of this treaty officially stipulated that only the Allied Powers defined in the treaty could benefit from this treaty. China was not listed as one of the Allied Powers; however, article 21 still provided limited benefits from Articles 10 and 14(a)2 for China. Japan's cession of Taiwan is unusual in that no recipient of Taiwan was stated as part of Dulles's plan of "neutralizing" Taiwan. The ROC protested its lack of invitation to the San Francisco Peace conference, to no avail.

1952 – Treaty of Taipei 

Subsequently, the Treaty of Taipei was concluded between the ROC and Japan on 28 April 1952 (effective 5 August), where Japan essentially re-affirmed the terms of the San Francisco Peace Treaty and formalized the peace between the ROC and Japan. It also nullified all previous treaties made between China and Japan.  Article 10 of the treaty specifies:"For the purposes of the present Treaty, nationals of the Republic of China shall be deemed to include all the inhabitants and former inhabitants of Taiwan (Formosa) and Penghu (the Pescadores) and their descendants who are of the Chinese nationality in accordance with the laws and regulations which have been or may hereafter be enforced by the Republic of China in Taiwan (Formosa) and Penghu (the Pescadores)." However, the ROC Minister of Foreign Affairs George Kung-ch'ao Yeh told the Legislative Yuan after signing the treaty that: "The delicate international situation makes it that they [Taiwan and Penghu] do not belong to us. Under present circumstances, Japan has no right to transfer [Taiwan] to us; nor can we accept such a transfer from Japan even if she so wishes." In July 1971, the U.S. State Department's position was, and remains: "As Taiwan and the Pescadores are not covered by any existing international disposition, sovereignty over the area is an unsettled question subject to future international resolution."

Question of sovereignty over Taiwan

Position of the People's Republic of China (PRC) 

The position of the PRC is that the ROC ceased to be a legitimate government upon the founding of the former on 1 October 1949 and that the PRC is the successor of the ROC as the sole legitimate government of China, with the right to rule Taiwan under the succession of states theory.

The position of the PRC is that the ROC and PRC are two different factions in the Chinese Civil War, which never legally ended. Therefore, the PRC claims that both factions belong to the same sovereign country—China. Since, as per the PRC, Taiwan's sovereignty belongs to China, the PRC's government and supporters believe that the secession of Taiwan should be agreed upon by all 1.3 billion Chinese citizens instead of just the 23 million residents of Taiwan. Furthermore, the position of PRC is that UN General Assembly Resolution 2758, which states "Recognizing that the representatives of the Government of the People's Republic of China are the only lawful representatives of China to the United Nations", means that the PRC is recognized as having the sovereignty of all of China, including Taiwan. Therefore, the PRC believes that it is within its legal rights to extend its jurisdiction to Taiwan by military means if at all necessary.

In addition, the position of the PRC is that the ROC does not meet the fourth criterion of the Montevideo Convention, as it is recognized by only  and has been denied access to international organizations such as the UN. The PRC points out the fact that the Montevideo Convention was only signed by 19 states at the Seventh International Conference of American States. Thus the authority of the United Nations as well as UN Resolutions, should supersede the Montevideo Convention. However, "When speaking of statehood, one invariably refers to the 1933 Montevideo Convention on the Rights and Duties of States, 60 which, laying down what is now considered a rule of customary international law, states that "[t] he State as a person of international law should possess the following qualifications: (a) a permanent population; (b) a defined territory; (c) government; and (d) capacity to enter into relations with other States." Taiwan indeed satisfies all these criteria for statehood." Many would argue that Taiwan meets all the requirements of the Montevideo Convention. But to make such an argument, one has to reject China's claim of sovereignty over the territory of the Taiwan island, a claim that has been recognized by most states in the world.

It is clear that the PRC still maintains that "there is only one China in the world" and "Taiwan is an inalienable part of China". However, instead of "the Government of the People's Republic of China is the sole legal government of China", the PRC now emphasizes that "both Taiwan and the mainland belong to one and same China". Although the current position allows for flexibility in terms of defining that "one China", any departure from the One-China policy is deemed unacceptable by the PRC government. The PRC government is unwilling to negotiate with the ROC government under any formulation other than the One-China policy, although a more flexible definition of "one China" such as found in the 1992 consensus is possible under PRC policy. The PRC government considers the 1992 consensus a temporary measure to set aside sovereignty disputes and enable talks.

The PRC government considers perceived violations of its "One-China policy" or inconsistencies with it, such as supplying the ROC with arms a violation of its rights to territorial integrity. International news organizations often report that "China considers Taiwan a renegade province that must be united with the mainland by force if necessary", even though the PRC does not explicitly say that Taiwan is a "renegade province" in any press releases. However, official PRC media outlets and officials often refer to Taiwan as "China's Taiwan Province" or simply "Taiwan, China", and pressure international organizations to use the term.

Position of the Republic of China (ROC) 

The ROC argues that it maintains all the characteristics of a state and that it was not "replaced" or "succeeded" by the PRC because it has continued to exist long after the PRC's founding.

According to the Montevideo Convention of 1933, the most cited source for the definition of statehood, a state must possess a permanent population, a defined territory, a government, and the capacity to enter into relations with other states. Many argue that the ROC meets all these criteria. However, to make such an argument, one has to reject the PRC's claim of sovereignty over the territory of the Taiwan island, a claim that the PRC has forced all other states to accept as a condition to establish diplomatic relations with it, as well as severing said relations with the ROC. Most states have either officially recognized this claim or carefully worded their agreement ambiguously, such as the United States.

Both the original 1912 constitution and the 1923 draft version failed to list Taiwan as a part of the ROC since, at the time, Taiwan was a Japanese territory. It was only in the mid-1930s when both the CPC and KMT realized the future strategic importance of Taiwan that they altered their party positions to make a claim on Taiwan as a part of China. After losing the Civil War against the Communist Party in 1949, Chiang Kai-shek and the Nationalist Party fled to Taiwan and continued to maintain that their government represented all of China, i.e. both Taiwan and the mainland.

The position of most supporters of Taiwan independence is that the PRC is the government of "China" and that Taiwan is not part of China, defining "China" as only including Mainland China, Hong Kong, and Macau. Regarding the ROC, one ideology within Taiwan's independence regards the ROC as already an independent, sovereign state and seeks to amend the ROC's existing name, constitution, and existing framework to reflect the loss of ROC's mainland territory and transform the ROC into a Taiwan state; while another ideology of Taiwan independence regards the ROC as both a military government that has been administering the Taiwan island as a result of post-war military occupation on behalf of the allies of World War II since 1945, and a Chinese refugee regime currently in exile on Taiwan since 1949, and seeks to eliminate the ROC and establish a new independent Taiwan state.

The Democratic Progressive Party states that Taiwan has never been under the jurisdiction of the PRC and that the PRC does not exercise any hold over the 23 million Taiwanese on the island. On the other hand, the position of most Chinese unification supporters is that the Chinese Civil War is still not over since no peace agreement has ever been signed and that the current status is a state of ceasefire between two belligerents of "One China".

The position of the Republic of China has been that it is a de jure sovereign state. "Republic of China," according to the ROC government's definition, extended to both mainland China (Including Hong Kong and Macau) and the island of Taiwan.

In 1991, President Lee Teng-hui unofficially claimed that the government would no longer challenge the rule of the Communists in mainland China, the ROC government under Kuomintang (KMT) rule actively maintained that it was the sole legitimate government of China.  The Courts in Taiwan have never accepted President Lee's statement, primarily due to the reason that the (now defunct) National Assembly never officially changed the acclaimed national borders. Notably, the People's Republic of China claims that changing the national borders would be "a precursor to Taiwan independence".  The task of changing the national borders now requires a constitutional amendment passed by the Legislative Yuan and ratified by a majority of all eligible ROC voters, which the PRC has implied would constitute grounds for military attack.

On the other hand, though the constitution of the Republic of China promulgated in 1946 does not state exactly what territory it includes, the draft of the constitution of 1925 did individually list the provinces of the Republic of China and Taiwan was not among them, since Taiwan was arguably de jure part of Japan as the result of the Treaty of Shimonoseki of 1895. The constitution also stipulated in Article I.4, that "the territory of the ROC is the original territory governed by it; unless authorized by the National Assembly, it cannot be altered." However, in 1946, Sun Fo, son of Sun Yat-Sen and the minister of the Executive Yuan of the ROC, reported to the National Assembly that "there are two types of territory changes: 1. renouncing territory and 2. annexing new territory. The first example would be the independence of Mongolia, and the second example would be the reclamation of Taiwan. Both would be examples of territory changes." Japan renounced all rights to Taiwan in the Treaty of San Francisco in 1951 and the Treaty of Taipei of 1952 without an explicit recipient. While the ROC continuously ruled Taiwan after the government was directed to Taiwan by the General Order No. 1 (1945) to receive Japanese surrender, there has never been a meeting of the ROC National Assembly in making a territory change according to the ROC constitution. The explanatory memorandum to the constitution explained the omission of individually listing the provinces as opposed to the earlier drafts was an act of deliberate ambiguity: as the ROC government does not recognize the validity of the Treaty of Shimonoseki, based on Chiang Kai-shek's Denunciation of the treaty in the late 1930s, hence (according to this argument) the sovereignty of Taiwan was never disposed of by China. A ratification by the ROC National Assembly is, therefore, unnecessary.

The Additional Articles of the Constitution of the Republic of China have mentioned "Taiwan Province," and the now defunct National Assembly passed constitutional amendments that give the people of the "Free Area of the Republic of China", comprising the territories under its current jurisdiction, the sole right, until unification, to exercise the sovereignty of the Republic through elections of the President and the entire Legislature as well as through elections to ratify amendments to the ROC constitution. Also, Chapter I, Article 2 of the ROC constitution states that "The sovereignty of the Republic of China shall reside in the whole body of citizens." This suggests that the constitution implicitly admits that the sovereignty of the ROC is limited to the areas that it controls, even if there is no constitutional amendment that explicitly spells out the ROC's borders.

In 1999, ROC President Lee Teng-hui proposed a two-state theory (兩國論) in which both the Republic of China and the People's Republic of China would acknowledge that they are two separate countries with a special diplomatic, cultural, and historic relationship. This, however, drew an angry reaction from the PRC who believed that Lee was covertly supporting Taiwan independence.

President Chen Shui-bian (2000 – May 2008) fully supported the idea that the "Republic of China is an independent, sovereign country" but held the view that the Republic of China is Taiwan and Taiwan does not belong to the People's Republic of China. This is suggested in his Four-stage Theory of the Republic of China. Due to the necessity of avoiding war with the PRC, however, President Chen had refrained from formally declaring Taiwan's independence. Government publications have implied that Taiwan refers to the ROC, and "China" refers to the PRC. After becoming chairman of the Democratic Progressive Party in July 2002, Chen appeared to move further than Lee's special two-state theory and in early August 2002, by putting forward the "one country on each side" concept, he stated that Taiwan may "go on its own Taiwanese road" and that "it is clear that the two sides of the straits are separate countries." These statements essentially eliminate any "special" factors in the relations and were strongly criticized by opposition parties in Taiwan. President Chen has repeatedly refused to endorse the One China Principle or the more "flexible" 1992 Consensus the PRC demands as a precursor to negotiations with the PRC. During Chen's presidency, there had not been any successful attempts to restart negotiations on a semi-official level.

In the 2008 ROC elections, the people delivered KMT's Ma Ying-jeou with an election win as well as a sizable majority in the legislature. President Ma, throughout his election campaign, maintained that he would accept the 1992 consensus and promote better relations with the PRC. In respect of Taiwan's political status, his policy was 1. he would not negotiate with the PRC on the subject of unification during his term; 2. he would never declare Taiwan's independence; and 3. he would not provoke the PRC into attacking Taiwan. He officially accepted the 1992 Consensus in his inauguration speech, which resulted in direct semi-official talks with the PRC, and this later led to the commencement of weekend direct charter flights between mainland China and Taiwan. President Ma also interprets the cross-strait relations as "special", "but not that between two nations". He later stated that mainland China is part of the territory of the Republic of China, and laws relating to international relations are not applicable to the relations between mainland China and Taiwan, as they are parts of a state.

In 2016, Tsai Ing-Wen of the DPP won a landslide victory in the Presidential election and was later re-elected for the second term in 2020. She refused to agree that Taiwan is part of China and also rejected the One country, two systems model proposed by the PRC. Instead, she said that Taiwan is already an independent country and that Beijing must face this reality.

Position of other countries and international organizations 

Because of anti-communist sentiment at the start of the Cold War, the Republic of China was initially recognized as the sole legitimate government of China by the United Nations and most Western nations. On 9 January 1950, the Israeli government extended recognition to the People's Republic of China. United Nations General Assembly Resolution 505, passed on 1 February 1952, considered the Chinese communists to be rebels against the Republic of China. However, the 1970s saw a switch in diplomatic recognition from the ROC to the PRC. On 25 October 1971, Resolution 2758 was passed by the UN General Assembly, which "decides to restore all its rights to the People's Republic of China and to recognize the representatives of its Government as the only legitimate representatives of China to the United Nations, and to expel forthwith the representatives of Chiang Kai-shek from the place which they unlawfully occupy at the United Nations and in all the organizations related to it."  Multiple attempts by the Republic of China to rejoin the UN, no longer to represent all of China but just the people of the territories it governs, have not made it past committee, largely due to diplomatic maneuvering by the PRC, which claims Resolution 2758 has settled the matter.

The PRC refuses to maintain diplomatic relations with any nation that recognizes the ROC, but does not object to nations conducting economic, cultural, and other such exchanges with Taiwan that do not imply diplomatic relations. Therefore, many nations that have diplomatic relations with Beijing maintain quasi-diplomatic offices in Taipei. Similarly, the government in Taiwan maintains quasi-diplomatic offices in most nations under various names, most commonly as the Taipei Economic and Cultural Office.

The United States of America is one of the main allies of Taiwan and since the Taiwan Relations Act passed in 1979, the United States has sold arms and provided military training to Taiwan's Republic of China Armed Forces. This situation continues to be a point of contention for the People's Republic of China, which considers US involvement disruptive to the stability of the region. In January 2010, the Obama administration announced its intention to sell $6.4 billion worth of military hardware to Taiwan. As a consequence, China threatened the United States with economic sanctions and warned that their cooperation on international and regional issues could suffer. The official position of the United States is that China is expected to "use no force or threat[en] to use force against Taiwan" and that Taiwan is to "exercise prudence in managing all aspects of Cross-Strait relations." Both are to refrain from performing actions or espousing statements "that would unilaterally alter Taiwan's status." The United States maintains the American Institute in Taiwan.

The United States, the United Kingdom, Japan, India, Pakistan, and Canada have formally adopted the One China policy, under which the People's Republic of China is theoretically the sole legitimate government of China. However, the United States and Japan acknowledge rather than recognize the PRC position that Taiwan is part of China. In the case of the United Kingdom and Canada, bilateral written agreements state that the two respective parties take note of Beijing's position but do not use the word support. The UK government's position that "the future of Taiwan be decided peacefully by the peoples of both sides of the Strait" has been stated several times. Despite the PRC's claim that the United States opposes Taiwanese independence, the United States takes advantage of the subtle difference between "oppose" and "does not support". In fact, a substantial majority of the statements Washington has made say that it "does not support Taiwan independence" instead of saying that it "opposes" independence. Thus, the US currently does not take a position on the political outcome, except for one explicit condition that there be a peaceful resolution to the differences between the two sides of the Taiwan Strait. The United States bi-partisan position is that it does not recognize the PRC's claim over Taiwan, and considers Taiwan's status as unsettled. All of this ambiguity has resulted in the United States constantly walking on a diplomatic tightrope with regard to cross strait relations.

Additionally, the Holy See also recognizes the ROC, a largely non-Christian/Catholic state, due partly to the Catholic Church's traditional opposition to communism and also to protest what it sees as the PRC's suppression of the Catholic faith in mainland China. However, Vatican diplomats were engaged in talks with PRC politicians at the time of Pope John Paul II's death, with a view towards improving relations between the two countries. When asked, one Vatican diplomat suggested that relations with Taiwan might prove "expendable" should PRC be willing to engage in positive diplomatic relations with the Holy See. Under Pope Benedict XVI, the Vatican and PRC have shown greater interest in establishing ties, including the appointment of pro-Vatican bishops and the Pope canceling a planned visit from the 14th Dalai Lama.

During the 1990s, there was a diplomatic tug-of-war in which the PRC and ROC attempted to outbid each other to obtain the diplomatic support of small nations. This struggle seems to have slowed as a result of the PRC's growing economic power and doubts in Taiwan as to whether this aid was actually in the Republic of China's interest.  In March 2004, Dominica switched recognition to the PRC in exchange for a large aid package. However, in late 2004, Vanuatu briefly switched recognition from Beijing to Taipei, followed by a return to its recognition of Beijing. On 20 January 2005, Grenada switched its recognition from Taipei to Beijing, in return for millions in aid (US$1,500 for every Grenadian). However, on 14 May 2005, Nauru announced the restoration of formal diplomatic relations with Taipei after a three-year hiatus, during which it briefly recognized the People's Republic of China.

On 26 October 2005, Senegal broke off relations with the Republic of China and established diplomatic contacts with Beijing. The following year, on 5 August 2006, Taipei ended relations with Chad when Chad established relations with Beijing. On 26 April 2007, however, Saint Lucia, which had previously severed ties with the Republic of China following a change of government in December 1996, announced the restoration of formal diplomatic relations with Taipei. On 7 June 2007, Costa Rica broke off diplomatic ties with the Republic of China in favour of the People's Republic of China. In January 2008, Malawi's foreign minister reported Malawi decided to cut diplomatic recognition of the Republic of China and recognize the People's Republic of China.

The latest countries to break off formal diplomatic relations with Taiwan were Burkina Faso on 24 May 2018, El Salvador on 21 August 2018, the Solomon Islands and Kiribati in September 2019, Nicaragua on 9 December 2021, and Honduras in March 2023. On 4 November 2013, the Government of the Gambia announced its break-up with Taiwan, but the Foreign Affairs Ministry of China denied any ties with this political movement, adding that they were not considering on building a relation with this African nation.

Currently, the countries who maintain formal diplomatic relations with the ROC are:

  (1989)
  (1968)
  (1960)
  (1956)
  (1998)
  (1980–2002, 2005)
  (1999)
  (1957)
  (1983)
  (1984–1997, 2007)
  (1981)
  (1979)

 1. Until 2018 called Swaziland.

Under continuing pressure from the PRC to bar any representation of the ROC that may imply statehood, international organizations have adopted different policies toward the issue of ROC's participation. In cases where almost all UN members or sovereign states participate, such as the World Health Organization, the ROC has been completely shut out, while in others, such as the World Trade Organization (WTO) and International Olympic Committee (IOC) the ROC participates under unusual names: "Chinese Taipei" in the case of APEC and the IOC, and the "Separate Customs Territory of Taiwan, Penghu, Kimmen and Matsu" (often shortened as "Chinese Taipei") in the case of the WTO. After nine years of negotiations, members of the WTO completed the conditions on which to allow Taiwan admittance into the multilateral trade organization. At the end of 2011, Jeffery Bader, Assistant United States Trade Representative for China, Taiwan, Hong Kong, and Macau, led and finalized the final stages of Taiwan's accession to the WTO, which were approved by trade ministers in November in Doha, Qatar.
The issue of ROC's name came under scrutiny during the 2006 World Baseball Classic. The organizers of the 16-team tournament intended to call Taiwan as such but reverted to "Chinese Taipei" under pressure from PRC. The ROC protested the decision, claiming that the WBC is not an IOC event, but did not prevail. The ISO 3166 directory of names of countries and territories registers Taiwan (TW) separately from and in addition to the People's Republic of China (CN), but lists Taiwan as "Taiwan, Province of China" based on the name used by the UN under PRC pressure. In ISO 3166-2:CN, Taiwan is also coded CN-71 under China, thus making Taiwan part of China in ISO 3166-1 and ISO 3166-2 categories.

Naming issues surrounding Taiwan/ROC continue to be a contentious issue in non-governmental organizations such as the Lions Club, which faced considerable controversy naming its Taiwanese branch.

Legal arguments

Arguments for the Republic of China and/or People's Republic of China sovereignty claims 

Today, the ROC is the de facto government of Taiwan, whereas the PRC is the de facto government of Mainland China. However, each government claims to be the legitimate government of all China's de jure. The arguments below are frequently used by proponents and/or opponents of these claims.

Arguments common to both the PRC and ROC

The ROC and PRC both officially support the One China policy and thus share common arguments. In the arguments below, "Chinese" is an ambiguous term that could mean the PRC and/or ROC as legal government(s) of China.

 The waging of aggressive war by Japan against China in 1937 and beyond violates the peace that was brokered in the Treaty of Shimonoseki. In 1941, with the declaration of war against Japan, the Chinese government declared this treaty void ab initio (never happened in the first place). Therefore, some argue that, with no valid transfer of sovereignty taking place, the sovereignty of Taiwan naturally belongs to China.
 The Cairo Declaration of 1 December 1943 was accepted by Japan in its surrender. This document states that Taiwan was to be restored to the Republic of China at the end of World War II. Likewise, the Potsdam Declaration of 26 July 1945, also accepted by Japan, implies that it will no longer have sovereignty over Taiwan by stating that "Japanese sovereignty shall be limited to the islands of Honshu, Hokkaido, Kyushu, Shikoku, and such minor islands".
 The proclamation of Taiwan Retrocession Day on 25 October 1945 by the ROC (when the PRC had not yet been founded) was entirely uncontested. Had another party been sovereign over Taiwan, that party would have had a period of years in which to protest, and its failure to do so represents cession of rights in the manner of prescription. The lack of protest by any non-Chinese government persists to this day, further strengthening this argument.
 The exclusion of Chinese governments (both ROC and PRC) in the negotiation process of the San Francisco Peace Treaty (SFPT) nullified any legally binding power of the SFPT on China, including any act of renouncing or disposing of sovereignty. In addition, the fact that neither ROC nor PRC government ever ratified SFPT terms prescribes that the SFPT is irrelevant to any discussion of Chinese sovereignty.
 Even if the SFPT were determinative, it should be interpreted in a manner consistent with the Potsdam and Cairo Declarations. Therefore, sovereignty would still have been transferred to China.
 SFPT's validity has come into question as some of the countries participating in the San Francisco conference, such as the USSR, Poland, Czechoslovakia, and North and South Korea, refused to sign the treaty.
 Assuming SFPT is valid in determining the sovereignty over Taiwan, Japan, in article 2 of the SFPT, renounced all rights, without assigning a recipient, regarding Taiwan. Japan, in the same article, also renounced, without assigning a recipient, areas that are now internationally recognized as territories of Russia as well as other countries. Given that the sovereignty of these countries over renounced areas is undisputed, the Chinese sovereignty over Taiwan must also be undisputed.

Arguments in support of ROC sovereignty claims

 The ROC fulfills all requirements for a state according to the Convention of Montevideo, which means it has a territory, a people, and a government.
 The ROC continues to exist since its establishment in 1911, only on a reduced territory after 1949.
 The creation and continuity of a state is only a factual issue, not a legal question. Declarations and recognition by other states cannot have any impact on their existence. According to the declaratory theory of recognition, the recognition of third states is not a requirement for being a state. Most of the cited declarations by American or British politicians are not legal statements but solely political intents.
 The PRC has never exercised control over Taiwan.
 The Treaty of Taipei formalized the peace between Japan and the ROC. In it, Japan reaffirmed Cairo Declaration and Potsdam Declaration and voided all treaties conducted between China and Japan (including the Treaty of Shimonoseki).
 Applying the principle of uti possidetis with regard to the Treaty of Taipei would grant Taiwan's sovereignty to the ROC, as it is undisputed that at the coming into force of the treaty, the ROC controlled Taiwan.
 Article 4 of the ROC Constitution clearly states that "The territory of the Republic of China" is defined  "according to its existing national boundaries..."  Taiwan was historically part of China and is, therefore, naturally included therein. Also, as Treaty of Shimonoseki is void ab initio, China has never legally dispossessed of the sovereignty of the territory. There is, accordingly, no need to have a National Assembly resolution to include the territory.
 The ROC – USA Mutual Defense Treaty of 1955 states that "the terms "territorial" and "territories" shall mean in respect of the Republic of China, Taiwan, and the Pescadores" and thus can be read as implicitly recognizing the ROC sovereignty over Taiwan. However, the treaty was terminated in 1980.

Arguments in support of PRC sovereignty claims
 The PRC does not recognize the validity of any of the unequal treaties the Qing signed in the "century of humiliation," as it considers them all unjust and illegal, as is the position during Transfer of sovereignty of Hong Kong from the United Kingdom to the PRC. As such, the cession of Taiwan in the 1895 Treaty of Shimonoseki actually never took place in a de jure fashion. The PRC, as the successor to the Qing and ROC in that order, therefore inherited the sovereignty of Taiwan.
 The return of the sovereignty of Taiwan to the ROC was confirmed on 25 October 1945 on the basis of the Cairo Declaration, Potsdam Proclamation, Japanese Instrument of Surrender, and the invalidity of the Treaty of Shimonoseki. According to United Nations General Assembly Resolution 2758, the PRC became the successor government to the ROC in representing China, and as such, the PRC should hold the sovereignty of Taiwan.
 In the Joint Communique of the Government of Japan and the Government of the People's Republic of China to the end of the Treaty of Taipei, the document signifying the commencement of the PRC and Japan's formal relations, Japan in article 3 stated that it fully understands and respects the position of the Government of the People's Republic of China that Taiwan is an inalienable part of the territory of the People's Republic of China. Japan also firmly maintains its stand under Article 8 of the Potsdam Declaration, which says, "the terms of the Cairo Declaration shall be carried out". The Cairo Declaration says, "All territories Japan has stolen from China, including Manchuria, Taiwan, and the Pescadores, shall be restored to the Republic of China". The PRC argues that it is a successor state of the ROC and is therefore entitled to all of the ROC's holdings and benefits.

Arguments for Taiwanese self-sovereignty claims and its legal status 

Arguments for Taiwan already being an independent, sovereign nation
 The peace that was brokered in the Treaty of Shimonoseki was breached by the Boxer Rebellion, which led to the conclusion of the Boxer Protocol of 1901 (Peace Agreement between the Great Powers and China), and China, not by the Second Sino-Japanese War. The Treaty of Shimonoseki was a dispositive treaty. Therefore, it is not voidable or nullifiable (this doctrine being that treaties specifying particular actions which can be completed, once the action gets completed, cannot be voided or reversed without a new treaty specifically reversing that clause). Hence, the unequal treaty doctrine cannot be applied to this treaty. By way of comparison, as 200,000,000 Kuping taels were not returned to China from Japan, and Korea had not become a Chinese-dependent country again, the cession in the treaty was executed and cannot be nullified. The disposition of Formosa and the Pescadores in this treaty was a legitimate cession by conquest, confirmed by treaty, and thus is not a theft, as described as "all the territories Japan has stolen from the Chinese" in Cairo Declaration.
 It should also be noted that the Qing court exercised effective sovereignty over primarily the west coast of Taiwan only, and even then did not regard the area as an integral part of national Chinese territory.
 The "Cairo Declaration" was merely an unsigned press communiqué which does not carry a legal status, while the Potsdam Proclamation and Instrument of Surrender are simply modus vivendi and armistice that function as temporary records and do not bear legally binding power to transfer sovereignty. Good faith of interpretation only takes place at the level of treaties.
 The "retrocession" proclaimed by ROC in 1945 was legally null and impossible since Taiwan was still de jure part of Japan before the post-war San Francisco Peace Treaty came into effect on 28 April 1952.  Consequently, the announcement of the mass-naturalization of native Taiwanese persons as ROC citizens in January 1946 is unjust and void Ab initio. After the San Francisco Peace Treaty came into effect, the sovereignty of Taiwan naturally belonged to the Taiwanese people.
 Some of Taiwan independence supporters once used arguments not in favor of Chinese sovereignty to dispute to legitimacy of the Kuomintang-controlled government that ruled over Taiwan; they have dropped these arguments due to the democratization of Taiwan. This has allowed the more moderate supporters of independence to stress the popular sovereignty theory in order to accept the legitimacy of the Republic of China (whose government the Democratic Progressive Party used to control) in Taiwan.  Former President Chen Shui-bian, by his interpretation of the "Republic of China", has repeatedly confirmed that the "Republic of China is Taiwan."
 Sovereignty transfer to the ROC by prescription does not apply to Taiwan's case since:
 Prescription is the manner of acquiring property by a long, honest, and uninterrupted possession or use during the time required by law. The possession must have been possessio longa, continua, et pacifica, nec sit ligitima interruptio (long, continued, peaceable, and without lawful interruption). For prescription to apply, the state with title to the territory must acquiesce to the action of the other state. Yet, PRC has never established an occupation on Taiwan and exercised sovereignty;
 Prescription as a rule for acquiring sovereignty itself is not universally accepted. The International Court of Justice ruled that Belgium retained its sovereignty over territories even by non-assertion of its rights and by acquiescence to acts of sovereign control alleged to have been exercised by the Netherlands over a period of 109 years;
 Also by way of comparison, even after 38 years of continuous control, the international community did not recognize sovereignty rights to the Gaza Strip by Israel, and the Israeli cabinet formally declared an end to military rule there as of 12 September 2005, with a removal of all Israeli settlers and military bases from the Strip;
 A pro-independence group, which formed a Provisional Government of Formosa in 2000, argued that both the 228 incident of 1947 and the Provisional Government of Formosa have constituted protests against ROC government's claim of retrocession within a reasonable twenty-five-year (or more) acquiescence period;
 Taiwanese residents were unable to make a protest after the 228 incident due to the authoritarian rule under KMT regime which suppressed all pro-independence opinion; and
 Japan was not able to cast a protest as it was under military occupation at the time; however, it did not renounce its sovereignty over Taiwan until 28 April 1952.

Arguments by various groups that claim Taiwan should declare itself to be an independent sovereign nation
 As one of the "territories which detached from enemy states as a result of the Second World War" defined in the articles 76b and 77b of the United Nations Charter, which China signed in 1945 and also defined in the protocol of Yalta Conference, Taiwan qualifies for the UN trusteeship program, and after a period of time would later be considered fully independent.  The ROC, as a founding member of the United Nations, has a treaty obligation to comply with the UN Charter and to help the people living in Taiwan enjoy the right of self-determination.
 The San Francisco Peace Treaty is definitive, where Japan ceded Taiwan (like Sakhalin and Kuril Islands etc.) without specifying a clear recipient. China was prohibited from acquiring Taiwan sovereignty as a benefit when the treaty was finalized. Moreover, the Treaty of Taipei only became effective on 5 August 1952, over three months after the coming into force of the San Francisco Peace Treaty on 28 April 1952. Hence, the Treaty of Taipei cannot be interpreted to have ceded the sovereignty of Taiwan to the ROC or the PRC, but only as a recognition of the territories which ROC had and under its control, as Japan cannot cede what it no longer possessed.
 Since the peace brokered in the Boxer Protocol of 1901 was breached by the second Sino-Japanese War, the San Francisco Peace Treaty specifies that the date to be used in returning territory to China in Article 10 was 1901, not 1895. The postliminium restoration of China was completed without sovereignty over Taiwan since Taiwan was not part of China when the first Chinese Republic was established in 1911. Moreover, the Treaty of Taipei was abrogated by Japan upon the PRC's request in 1972.
 Cession of Taiwan without a recipient was neither unusual nor unique, since Cuba, as a precedent, was ceded by Spain without recipient in Treaty of Paris of 1898 as the result of Spanish–American War. Cuba reached independence in May 1902.  At the end of WWII, Libya and Somaliland were also relinquished without recipient by Italy in the Treaty of peace with Italy of 1947, and both reached independence later.
 The Nationality Law of the Republic of China was originally promulgated in February 1929. However, no amendment or change to this law or any other law has ever been made by the Legislative Yuan in the post WWII period to reflect any mass-naturalization of native Taiwanese persons as ROC citizens.  This is important because Article 10 of the Treaty of Taipei specifies: "For the purposes of the present Treaty, nationals of the Republic of China shall be deemed to include all the inhabitants and former inhabitants of Taiwan (Formosa) and Penghu (the Pescadores) and their descendants who are of the Chinese nationality in accordance with the laws and regulations which have been or may hereafter be enforced by the Republic of China in Taiwan (Formosa) and Penghu (the Pescadores) ... " Since no relevant laws or regulations have ever been promulgated, there is no legal basis to consider native Taiwanese persons as ROC citizens.
 Furthermore, it is recognized that the ROC government currently administering Taiwan is not the same ROC that accepted Japanese surrender in 1945, because the ruling authorities were given popular mandate by different pools of constituencies: one is the mainland Chinese electorate, the other local Taiwanese. The popular sovereignty theory, to which the Pan-Green coalition subscribes, emphasizes that Taiwan could make fundamental constitutional changes and choose a new national title by means of a popular referendum.  (In contrast, the ROC legal theory, which is supported by the Pan-Blue coalition suggests that any fundamental constitutional changes would require that the amendment procedure of the ROC constitution be followed.)
 Nevertheless, the popular sovereignty theory does not contradict any arguments in favor of self-determination, nor does it affirm arguments in favor of Chinese sovereignty.  This means that at present the only obstacle against declaring Taiwan independence is a lack of consensus among the Taiwanese people to do so; however, it is clear that the consensus is changing as the Taiwanese people begin preparations for their 15th application for entrance to the United Nations in the fall of 2007.
 The San Francisco Peace Treaty's omission of "China" as a participant was not an accident of history, but reflected the status that the Republic of China had failed to maintain its original position as the de jure and de facto government of the "whole China".  By fleeing to Taiwan island in December 1949, the ROC government has then arguably become a government in exile. Under international law, there are no actions which a government in exile can take in its current location of residence in order to be recognized as the local legitimate government. Hence, Taiwan's current international situation has arisen from the fact that the ROC is not completely internationally recognized as a legitimate state. (Note: the ROC government has limited recognition as the sole legitimate government of China (including Taiwan), but not as a government of Taiwan island.)

Controversies 
Many political leaders who have maintained some form of the One-China Policy have committed slips of the tongue in referring to Taiwan as a country or as the Republic of China.  United States presidents Ronald Reagan and George W. Bush have been known to have referred to Taiwan as a country during their terms of office.  Although near the end of his term as U.S. Secretary of State, Colin Powell said that Taiwan is not a state, he referred to Taiwan as the Republic of China twice during a testimony to the U.S. Senate Foreign Relations Committee on 9 March 2001.  In the People's Republic of China Premier Zhu Rongji's farewell speech to the National People's Congress, Zhu accidentally referred to Mainland China and Taiwan as two countries.  Zhu says in his speech at MIT University on April 15, 1999, "These raw materials and the components are mainly imported from Japan, [Korea], Taiwan, Hong Kong, Singapore, while the value-added parts in China is very, very insignificant. That is to say, Chinese exports to the United States actually represent a transfer of the exports to the United States by the above-mentioned countries and the regions that I mentioned." There are also those from the PRC who informally refer to Taiwan as a country.  South Africa delegates once referred to Taiwan as the "Republic of Taiwan" during Lee Teng-hui's term as President of the ROC. In 2002, Michael Bloomberg, the mayor of New York City, referred to Taiwan as a country.  Most recently, former US Secretary of Defense Donald Rumsfeld stated in a local Chinese newspaper in California in July 2005 that Taiwan is "a sovereign nation". The People's Republic of China discovered the statement about three months after it was made.

In a controversial speech on 4 February 2006, Japanese Foreign Minister Taro Aso called Taiwan a country with very high education levels because of previous Japanese colonial rule over the island. One month later, he told a Japanese parliamentary committee that "[Taiwan's] democracy is considerably matured and liberal economics is deeply ingrained, so it is a law-abiding country. In various ways, it is a country that shares a sense of values with Japan."  At the same time, he admitted that "I know there will be a problem with calling [Taiwan] a country". Later, the Japanese Foreign Ministry tried to downplay or reinterpret his remarks.

In February 2007, the Royal Grenada Police Band played the National Anthem of the Republic of China in an inauguration of the reconstructed St George's Queen's Park Stadium funded by the PRC. Grenada had broken off diplomatic relations with Taiwan just two years prior in favor of the PRC.

When the Kuomintang visited Mainland China in 2005, the government-controlled PRC media called this event a "visit," and called the KMT one of "Taiwan's political parties" even though the Kuomintang's full name remains the "Chinese Nationalist Party." In mainland China, there is a legal party called the Revolutionary Committee of the Kuomintang that is officially one of the nine "consultative parties," according to the PRC's Chinese People's Political Consultative Conference.

On the Foreign Missions page of the Saudi Arabian Ministry of Foreign Affairs for China, the embassy of the People's Republic of China was referred to as the "Republic of China".

Taiwan was classified as a province of the People's Republic of China in the Apple Maps application in 2013; searches for "Taiwan" were changed automatically to "China Taiwan province" in Simplified Chinese, prompting the Taiwanese Ministry of Foreign Affairs to demand a correction from Apple.

Possible military solutions and intervention 
Until 1979, both sides intended to resolve the conflict militarily. Intermittent clashes occurred throughout the 1950s and 1960s, with escalations comprising the First and Second Taiwan Strait crises. In 1979, with the U.S. change of diplomatic recognition to the PRC, the ROC lost its ally needed to "recover the mainland." Meanwhile, the PRC's desire to be accepted in the international community led it to promote peaceful unification under what would later be termed "one country, two systems", rather than to "liberate Taiwan" and to make Taiwan a Special Administrative Region.

PRC's condition on military intervention 
Notwithstanding, the PRC government has issued triggers for an immediate war with Taiwan, most notably via its controversial Anti-Secession Law of 2005. These conditions are:
 if events occur leading to the "separation" of Taiwan from China in any name, or
 if a major event occurs which would lead to Taiwan's "separation" from China, or
 if all possibility of peaceful unification is lost.

It has been interpreted that these criteria encompass the scenario of Taiwan developing nuclear weapons (see main article Taiwan and weapons of mass destruction also Timeline of the Republic of China's nuclear program).

The third condition has especially caused a stir in Taiwan as the term "indefinitely" is open to interpretation. It has also been viewed by some as meaning that preserving the ambiguous status quo is not acceptable to the PRC, although the PRC stated on many occasions that there is no explicit timetable for unification.

Concern over a formal declaration of de jure Taiwan independence is a strong impetus for the military buildup between Taiwan and mainland China.  The former US Bush administration publicly declared that given the status quo, it would not aid Taiwan if it were to declare independence unilaterally.

According to the US Department of Defense report "Military and Security Developments Involving the People's Republic of China 2011", the conditions that mainland China has warned that may cause the use of force have varied. They have included "a formal declaration of Taiwan independence; undefined moves "toward independence"; foreign intervention in Taiwan's internal affairs; indefinite delays in the resumption of cross-Strait dialogue on unification; Taiwan's acquisition of nuclear weapons; and, internal unrest on Taiwan. Article 8 of the March 2005 "Anti-Secession Law" states Beijing would resort to "non-peaceful means" if "secessionist forces . . . cause the fact of Taiwan's secession from China," if "major incidents entailing Taiwan's secession" occur, or if "possibilities for peaceful reunification" are exhausted".

Balance of power 
The possibility of war, the close geographic proximity of ROC-controlled Taiwan and PRC-controlled mainland China, and the resulting flare-ups that occur every few years, conspire to make this one of the most watched focal points in the Pacific. Both sides have chosen to have a strong naval presence. However, naval strategies between both powers greatly shifted in the 1980s and 1990s, while the ROC assumed a more defensive attitude by building and buying frigates and missile destroyers, and the PRC a more aggressive posture by developing long-range cruise missiles and supersonic surface-to-surface missiles.

Although the People's Liberation Army Air Force is considered large, most of its fleet consists of older generation J-7 fighters (localized MiG-21s and Mig-21BIs), raising doubts over the PLAAF's ability to control Taiwan's airspace in the event of a conflict. Since mid-1990s, PRC has been purchasing, and later localizing, SU-27 based fighters. These Russian fighters, as well as their Chinese J11A variants, are currently over 170 in number, and have increased the effectiveness of PLAAF's Beyond Visual Range (BVR) capabilities. The introduction of 60 new-generation J10A fighters is anticipated to increase the PLAAF's firepower. PRC's acquisition of Russian Su30MKKs further enhanced the PLAAF's air-to-ground support ability. The ROC's air force, on the other hand, relies on Taiwan's fourth generation fighters, consisting of 150 US-built F-16 Fighting Falcons, approximately 60 French-built Mirage 2000-5s, and approximately 130 locally developed IDFs (Indigenous Defense Fighters). All of these ROC fighter jets are able to conduct BVR combat missions with BVR missiles, but the level of technology in mainland Chinese fighters is catching up.  Also, the United States Defense Intelligence Agency has reported that few of Taiwan's 400 total fighters are operationally capable.

But with the growth of the PRC navy and air force, some doubt that the ROC could withstand a determined invasion attempt from mainland China in the future. These concerns have led to a view in certain quarters that Taiwanese independence, if it is to be implemented, should be attempted as early as possible, while the ROC still has the capacity to defend itself in an all-out military conflict. Over the past three decades, estimates of how long the ROC can withstand a full-scale invasion from across the Strait without any outside help have decreased from three months to only six days. Given such estimates, the US Navy has continued practicing "surging" its carrier groups, giving it the experience necessary to respond quickly to an attack on Taiwan. The US also collects data on the PRC's military deployments, through the use of spy satellites, for example. Early surveillance may effectively identify PRC's massive military movement, which may imply PRC's preparation for a military assault against Taiwan.

Naturally, war contingencies are not being planned in a vacuum. In 1979, the United States Congress passed the Taiwan Relations Act, a law generally interpreted as mandating U.S. defense of Taiwan in the event of an attack from the Chinese Mainland (the Act is applied to Taiwan and Penghu, but not to Kinmen or Matsu, which are usually considered to be part of Mainland China). The United States maintains the world's largest permanent fleet in the Pacific Region near Taiwan. The Seventh Fleet, operating primarily out of various bases in Japan, is a powerful naval contingent built upon the world's only permanently forward-deployed aircraft carrier . Although the stated purpose of the fleet is not Taiwanese defense, it can be safely assumed from past actions that it is one of the reasons why the fleet is stationed in those waters. It is written into the strategy of the United States department of defense within this region that, "First, we are strengthening our military capacity to ensure the United States can successfully deter conflict and coercion and respond decisively when needed.  Second, we are working together with our allies and partners from Northeast Asia to the Indian Ocean to build their capacity to address potential challenges in their waters and across the region.  Third, we are leveraging military diplomacy to build greater transparency, reduce the risk of miscalculation or conflict, and promote shared maritime rules of the road."

Starting in 2000, Japan renewed its defense obligations with the US and embarked on a rearmament program, partly in response to fears that Taiwan might be invaded. Some analysts believed that the PRC could launch preemptive strikes on military bases in Japan to deter US and Japanese forces from coming to the ROC's aid. Japanese strategic planners also see an independent Taiwan as vital, not only because the ROC controls valuable shipping routes, but also because its capture by PRC would make Japan more vulnerable. During World War II, the US invaded the Philippines, but another viable target to enable direct attacks on Japan would have been Taiwan (then known as Formosa). However, critics of the preemptive strike theory assert that the PRC would be loath to give Japan and the US such an excuse to intervene.

The United States Department of Defense in a 2011 report stated that the primary mission of the PRC military is a possible military conflict with Taiwan, including also possible US military assistance. Although the risk of a crisis in the short-term is low, in the absence of new political developments, Taiwan will likely dominate future military modernization and planning. However, also other priorities are becoming increasingly prominent and possible due to increasing military resources. Many of mainland China's most advanced military systems are stationed in areas opposite Taiwan. The rapid military modernization is continually changing the military balance of power towards mainland China.

A 2008 report by the RAND Corporation analyzing a theoretical 2020 attack by mainland China on Taiwan suggested that the US would likely not be able to defend Taiwan. Cruise missile developments may enable China to partially or completely destroy or make inoperative US aircraft carriers and bases in the Western Pacific. New Chinese radars will likely be able to detect US stealth aircraft and China is acquiring stealthy and more effective aircraft. The reliability of US beyond-visual-range missiles as a mean to achieve air superiority is questionable and largely unproven.

In 2021, Admiral Phillip Davidson said in a Senate Armed Services Committee hearing that China could take military action on Taiwan some time in the next 6 years. A spokesperson for China's foreign ministry later responded stating that Davidson was trying to "hype up China's military threat."

Third Taiwan Strait crisis 

In 1996, the PRC began conducting military exercises near Taiwan, and launched several ballistic missiles over the island.  The saber-rattling was done in response to the possible re-election of then President Lee Teng-hui. The United States, under President Clinton, sent two aircraft carrier battle groups to the region, reportedly sailing them into the Taiwan Strait. The PRC, unable to track the ships' movements, and probably unwilling to escalate the conflict, quickly backed down. The event had little impact on the outcome of the election, since none of Lee's contestants were strong enough to defeat him, but it is widely believed that the PRC's aggressive acts, far from intimidating the Taiwanese population, gave Lee a boost that pushed his share of votes over 50 percent.
This was an aggressively serious escalation in response to the Taiwan Strait and the ongoing conflict between China and Taiwan. This hostile reaction by mainland China is the result of China implementing Putnam's Two-level game theory. This theory suggests that the chief negotiator of a state must balance and abide by both international and domestic interests, and in some cases must focus more on domestic interests. In the case of China, "a serious escalation of tensions in the Taiwan Strait and raised the specter of war—one that could conceivably draw in the United States. This turn of events is either the result of pressure by hawkish, hard-line soldiers on moderate, mild-mannered statesmen for a tougher, more aggressive response to Taiwan, or a strong consensus among both civilian and military leaders in the Politburo."

Developments since 2004 and future prospects

Judicial 
On 24 October 2006, Roger C. S. Lin led a group of Taiwanese residents, including members of the Taiwan Nation Party, to file a complaint for declaratory relief in the United States District Court for the District of Columbia. According to their lawyer, Charles Camp, "the Complaint asks the Court to declare whether the Taiwanese plaintiffs, including members of the Taiwan Nation Party, have certain rights under the United States Constitution and other US laws". Their central argument is that, following Japanese renunciation of all rights and claims to Taiwan, Taiwan came under U.S. jurisdiction based on it being the principal occupying power as designated in the Treaty of Peace with Japan and remains so to this day. This case was opposed by the United States government.

The District Court agreed with United States government on 18 March 2008 and ruled that the case presents a political question; as such, the court concluded that it had no jurisdiction to hear the matter and dismissed the complaint. This decision was appealed by plaintiffs, and the appeals court unanimously upheld the district court ruling.

Political 

Although the situation is complex, most observers believe that it is stable with enough understandings and gentlemen's agreements to keep things from breaking out into open warfare.  The current controversy is over the term one China, as the PRC insists that the ROC must recognize this term to begin negotiations.  Although the Democratic Progressive Party has moderated its support for Taiwan independence, there is still insufficient support within that party for former President Chen Shui-bian to agree to one China.  By contrast, the Kuomintang (KMT) and the People First Party (PFP) appear willing to agree to some variation of one China, and observers believed the position of the PRC was designed to sideline Chen until the 2004 presidential election where it was hoped that someone who was more supportive of Chinese unification would come to power.  Partly to counter this, Chen Shui-bian announced in July 2002 that if the PRC does not respond to Taiwan's goodwill, Taiwan may "go on its own ... road." 
What ROC president, Chen Shui-bian, means by this is that there are other ways of combatting China as a powerful hegemon. For example, "If Taiwan's Chen Shui-bian had declared legal independence by a popular referendum, scholars agree that is could have immediately triggered a crisis in China, due to its political sensitivity on the mainland". Taiwan's forced establishment of sovereignty scares the PRC; so when they implement laws, such as the Anti-secession law, it angers ROC's public opinion, and actually creates a "rallying around the flag" effect in support of the Taiwanese independence movement.

With Chen's re-election in 2004, Beijing's prospects for a speedier resolution were dampened, though they seemed strengthened again following the Pan-Blue majority in the 2004 legislative elections. However, public opinion in Taiwan reacted unfavorably towards the anti-secession law passed by the PRC in March 2005. Following two high-profile visits by KMT and PFP party leaders to the PRC, the balance of public opinion appears to be ambiguous, with the Pan-Green Coalition gaining a majority in the 2005 National Assembly elections, but the Pan-Blue Coalition scoring a landslide victory in the 2005 municipal elections.

Legislative elections were held in Taiwan on 12 January 2008. The results gave the Kuomintang and the Pan-Blue Coalition an absolute majority (86 of the 113 seats) in the legislature, handing a heavy defeat to President Chen Shui-bian's Democratic Progressive Party, which won the remaining 27 seats. The junior partner in the Pan-Green Coalition, the Taiwan Solidarity Union, won no seats.

The election for the 12th President of ROC was held on 22 March 2008. Kuomintang candidate Ma Ying-jeou won, with 58% of the vote, ending eight years of Democratic Progressive Party (DPP) leadership. Along with the 2008 legislative election, Ma's landslide victory brought the Kuomintang back to power in Taiwan. This new political situation has led to a decrease of tension between both sides of the Taiwan Strait and the increase of cross-strait relations, making a declaration of independence, or war, something unlikely.

Taiwan's Straits Exchange Foundation (SEF) and its Chinese counterpart – the Association for Relations Across the Taiwan Strait (ARATS) – signed four agreements in Taipei on 4 November 2008. Both SEF and ARATS have agreed to address direct sea links, daily charter flights, direct postal service, and food safety.

It has been reported that China has set a 2049 deadline for the unification of Taiwan with Mainland China, which is the 100th anniversary of the founding of the PRC. CCP general secretary Xi Jinping has been saying that unification was part of the Chinese Dream.

In 2021, the Chinese Government stated that they would not allow pro-Taiwan independence people into China and also Hong Kong and Macau.

In May 2022, the U.S. State Department Taiwan fact sheet on its website was changed to remove wording on not supporting Taiwan independence and acknowledging China's position that Taiwan is part of China, which drew criticism the Chinese Foreign Ministry. A State Department spokesperson said that while the wording had changed, "our underlying policy has not changed" and "we do not support Taiwan independence".

Public opinion 
Public opinion in Taiwan regarding relations with the PRC is notoriously difficult to gauge, as poll results tend to be extremely sensitive to how the questions are phrased and what options are given, and there is a tendency by all political parties to spin the results to support their point of view.

According to a November 2005 poll from the Mainland Affairs Council, 37.7% of people living in the ROC favor maintaining the status quo until a decision can be made in the future, 18.4% favors maintaining the status quo indefinitely, 14% favors maintaining the status quo until eventual independence, 12% favors maintaining the status quo until eventual unification, 10.3% favors independence as soon as possible, and 2.1% favors unification as soon as possible. According to the same poll, 78.3% are opposed to the "One Country, Two Systems" model, which was used for Hong Kong and Macau, while 10.4% is in favor.
However, it is essential to consider current events or newly developing positions when determining public opinion in order to maintain accuracy and efficiency, especially when it comes to conducting foreign policy and determining Taiwan's political status and hopeful eventual independence. For example, "Large jumps in the proportion of independence supporters after China's missile test in mid-1996 (from 13% in February to 21% in March) and Lee Teng-hui's "special state-to-state" speech in mid-1999 (from 15% in March to 28% in August) suggest that the cross-Strait tension influenced the Taiwanese to become more independence-minded".
According to a June 2008 poll from a Taiwanese mainstream media TVBS, 58% of people living in Taiwan favor maintaining the status quo, 19% favors independence, and 8% favors unification.  According to the same poll, if status quo is not an option and the ones who were surveyed must choose between "Independence" or "Unification", 65% are in favor of independence while 19% would opt for unification. The same poll also reveals that, in terms of self-identity, when the respondents are not told that a Taiwanese can also be a Chinese, 68% of the respondents identify themselves as "Taiwanese" while 18% would call themselves "Chinese". However, when the respondents are told that duo identity is an option, 45% of the respondents identify themselves as "Taiwanese only", 4% of the respondents call themselves "Chinese only" while 45% of the respondents call themselves "both Taiwanese as well as Chinese".  Furthermore, when it comes to preference in which national identity to be used in international organizations, 54% of people in the survey indicated that they prefer "Taiwan", and only 25% of the people voted for "Chinese Taipei".

According to an October 2008 poll from the Mainland Affairs Council, on the question of Taiwan's status, 36.17% of respondents favor maintaining the status quo until a decision can be made in the future, 25.53% favors maintaining the status quo indefinitely, 12.49% favors maintaining the status quo until eventual independence, 4.44% favors maintaining the status quo until eventual unification, 14.80% favors independence as soon as possible, and 1.76% favors unification as soon as possible. In the same poll, on the question of the PRC government's attitude towards the ROC government, 64.85% of the respondents consider the PRC government hostile or very hostile, 24.89% consider the PRC government friendly or very friendly, while 10.27% did not express an opinion. On the question of the PRC government's attitude towards the people in Taiwan, 45.98% of the respondents consider the PRC government hostile or very hostile, 39.6% consider the PRC government friendly or very friendly, while 14.43% did not express an opinion.

In May 2009, Taiwan's (Republic of China) Department of the Interior published a survey examining whether people in Taiwan see themselves as Taiwanese, Chinese, or both. 64.6% see themselves as Taiwanese, 11.5% as Chinese, 18.1% as both, and 5.8% were unsure.

According to a December 2009 poll from a Taiwanese mainstream media TVBS, if status quo is not an option and the ones who were surveyed must choose between "Independence" or "Unification", 68% are in favor of independence while 13% would opt for unification.

As of March 2012, a poll by the Global Views Monthly indicated that support for Taiwanese independence has risen. According to the survey 28.2 percent of respondents indicated that they support a formal declaration for Taiwan independence, a rise of 3.7 percent compared to a similar poll conducted earlier in 2012. Asked whether Taiwan would eventually declare itself a new and independent nation, 49.1 percent replied yes while 38 percent responded negatively, the Global Views Monthly said. Only 22.9 percent agreed that Taiwan should eventually unify with China, while 63.5 percent disagreed.

A June 2013 poll conducted by DPP showed an overwhelming 77.6% consider themselves as Taiwanese. On the independence-unification issue, the survey found that 25.9 percent said they support unification, 59 percent support independence, and 10.3 percent prefer the "status quo." When asked whether Taiwan and China are parts of one country, the party said the survey found 78.4 percent disagree, while 15 percent agreed. As for whether Taiwan and China are two districts in one country, 70.6 percent disagree, while 22.8 percent agree, the survey showed. When asked which among four descriptions—"one country on each side," "a special state-to-state relationship," "one country, two areas," and "two sides are of one country"—they find the most acceptable, 54.9 percent said "one country on each side," 25.3 percent chose "a special state-to-state relationship," 9.8 percent said "one country, two areas", and 2.5 percent favor "two sides are of one country," the survey showed.

Changing Taiwan's status with respect to the ROC constitution 

From the perspective of the ROC constitution, which the mainstream political parties such as the KMT and DPP currently respect and recognize, changing the ROC's governing status or completely clarifying Taiwan's political status would at best require amending the ROC constitution.  In other words, if unification supporters wanted to unify Taiwan with mainland China in such a way that would effectively abolish the ROC or affect the ROC's sovereignty, or if independence supporters wanted to abolish the ROC and establish a Republic of Taiwan, they would also need to amend or abolish the ROC constitution and redraft a new constitution.  Passing an amendment requires an unusually broad political consensus, which includes approval from three-quarters of a quorum of members of the Legislative Yuan.  This quorum requires at least three-quarters of all members of the Legislature.  After passing the legislature, the amendments need ratification from at least fifty percent of all eligible voters of the ROC, irrespective of voter turnout.

Given these harsh constitutional requirements, neither the Pan-Greens nor the Pan-Blues can unilaterally change Taiwan's political and legal status with respect to the ROC's constitution.  However, extreme Taiwan independence supporters view the ROC's constitution as illegal and therefore believe that amendments to the ROC constitution are an invalid way to change Taiwan's political status.

Media coverage

Last Week Tonight 
On October 24, 2021, Last Week Tonight with John Oliver aired an episode about Taiwan after a petition on Change.org in June invited Oliver to discuss Taiwan's complex political situation and its international significance. In the segment, a brief but comprehensive history of Taiwan is provided with notable points such as occupation by the Dutch, Spanish, Manchu-Qing dynasty, and Japanese; path to becoming a prominent Asian democracy; and the strained relation with modern-day China. Oliver also highlighted Taiwan as the birthplace of bubble tea, apologies made by John Cena after referring to Taiwan as a country, and the hesitation of international organizations like the World Health Organization and the Olympics in properly representing Taiwan. He concluded the episode by emphasizing Taiwanese citizens' point of view and their right to determine the country's own future.

Note on terminology

Political status vs. Taiwan issue or Mainland issue 
Some scholarly sources as well as political entities like the PRC refer to Taiwan's controversial status as the "Taiwan question", "Taiwan issue", or "Taiwan problem".  The ROC government does not like these terminologies, emphasizing that it should be called the "Mainland issue" or "Mainland question", because from the ROC's point of view, the PRC is making an issue out of or creating a problem out of Taiwan.  Others use the term "Taiwan Strait Issue" because it implies nothing about sovereignty and because "Cross-Strait relations" is a term used by both the ROC and the PRC to describe their interactions. However, this term is also objectionable to some because it still implies that there is an issue, which they feel is created only by the PRC.

De facto vs. de jure and whether ROC ceased to exist 
The use of the terms de facto and de jure to describe Taiwan's as well as the Republic of China's status as a state is itself a contentious issue. This partially stems from the lack of precedents regarding derecognized, but still constitutionally functioning states (i.e., those meeting the four requirements of the Montevideo Convention). For instance, it is argued by Jacques deLisle that "An additional difficulty for Taiwan is the implicit fifth of the four criteria for statehood under international law: some assertion by the relevant authorities that the entity is, in fact, a state". For example, is recognition as a state by the UN a decisive feature of statehood, given that such recognition, for the most part, correlates well with entities recognised as states by customary international law? If this "implicit fifth" principle is accepted, then the Republic of China may have ceased to be a state post-1971 as a matter of international law ("de jure"), yet continued to otherwise function as the state that it previously was recognised as ("de facto").

From the 1990s onwards, media wire services sometimes describe Taiwan as having de facto independence, whereas the Republic of China has always considered itself as a continuously functioning de jure state.

See also 

 History of Taiwan
 History of Taiwan under Japanese rule
 History of the Republic of China
 Chinese Civil War
 Federalism in China
 Secession in China
 228 Incident, for historical context of ROC-Taiwanese conflict
 One Country on Each Side
 Theory of the Undetermined Status of Taiwan
 Four-stage Theory of the Republic of China
 Taiwan Province
 Taiwan Province, People's Republic of China
 Taiwan independence
 Cross-Strait Unification
 Federal Republic of China
 United States of China
 Cross-Strait relations
 Anti-Secession Law of the People's Republic of China
 Military Power of the People's Republic of China
 Republic of China and weapons of mass destruction
 People's Republic of China and weapons of mass destruction
 Mainland Affairs Council of the ROC
 Taiwan Affairs Office of the PRC
 Foreign relations of Taiwan
 Taiwan in United Nations
 Taiwan Relations Act
 TAIPEI Act
 Three Communiqués
 1992 Consensus
 51st state#Taiwan

Notes

References

Further reading 
 Bush, R. & O'Hanlon, M. (2007). A War Like No Other: The Truth About China's Challenge to America. Wiley. 
 Bush, R. (2006). Untying the Knot: Making Peace in the Taiwan Strait. Brookings Institution Press. 
 Carpenter, T. (2006). America's Coming War with China: A Collision Course over Taiwan. Palgrave Macmillan. 
 Cole, B. (2006). Taiwan's Security: History and Prospects. Routledge. 
 Copper, J. (2006). Playing with Fire: The Looming War with China over Taiwan. Praeger Security. 
 Federation of American Scientists et al. (2006). Chinese Nuclear Forces and U.S. Nuclear War Planning
 Gill, B. (2007). Rising Star: China's New Security Diplomacy. Brookings Institution Press. 
 Shirk, S. (2007). China: Fragile Superpower: How China's Internal Politics Could Derail Its Peaceful Rise. Oxford University Press. 
 Tsang, S. (2006). If China Attacks Taiwan: Military Strategy, Politics and Economics. Routledge. 
 Tucker, N.B. (2005). Dangerous Strait: the U.S.-Taiwan-China Crisis. Columbia University Press.

External links 

 Foreign Ministry of the People's Republic of China
 Government Information Office – Republic of China 
 Taiwan Affairs Office of the State Council – White Papers on Taiwan Issue  by the PRC
 China Taiwan Information Center (PRC perspective)
 
 Taiwan Documents Project A complete collection of Taiwan-related documents, based in Los Angeles, USA (favors Taiwan Independence)
 Taiwan and the World Trade Organization (by Steve Charnovitz)
 Who Owns Taiwan: A Dissection of International Title
 America and Taiwan, 1943–2004
 The Menacing Missiles of Taiwan 
 Australian White Paper on Taiwan relations 
 Cross-Strait Relations between China and Taiwan collection of documents and articles.
 Resolving the Political Status of Taiwan through the US Court system
 Republic of China Mainland Affairs Council 
 Sovereignty, Wealth, Culture, and Technology: Mainland China and Taiwan Grapple with the Parameters of the "Nation-State" in the 21st Century

Cross-Strait relations
History of Taiwan
Politics of Taiwan
Law of Taiwan
Sovereignty
Taiwan